Eureka is a city in Olio Township, Woodford County, Illinois, United States. The population was 5,295 at the 2010 census. It is the county seat of Woodford County. Eureka is part of the Peoria, Illinois Metropolitan Statistical Area.

Eureka is a small community centered on the intersection of what is now U.S. 24 and Illinois 117. It is also one of the towns along the Ronald Reagan Trail, a series of roads that connect towns in central Illinois that were of importance to Reagan's early life. President Reagan attended and graduated from Eureka College.

History
Eureka was originally laid out as Walnut Grove in 1855. The name was changed to Eureka because of a naming conflict with another Walnut Grove. Sources differ on who proposed the name Eureka. The city is named from the Greek expression Eureka, meaning "I have found it".

Geography
Eureka is located at  (40.715620, -89.275220).

Demographics

As of the 2000 United States Census, there were 4,871 people, 1,754 households, and 1,169 families residing in the city. The racial makeup of the city was 97.97% White, 0.57% African American, 0.37% Native American, 0.33% Asian, 0.16% from other races, and 0.60% from two or more races. Hispanic or Latino of any race were 1.03% of the population.

There were 1,754 households, out of which 31.7% had children under the age of 18 living with them, 55.9% were married couples living together, 8.3% had a female householder with no husband present, and 33.3% were non-families. 30.7% of all households were made up of individuals, and 17.3% had someone living alone who was 65 years of age or older. The average household size was 2.46 and the average family size was 3.12.

In the city, the population was spread out, with 24.3% under the age of 18, 14.5% from 18 to 24, 23.1% from 25 to 44, 16.9% from 45 to 64, and 21.1% who were 65 years of age or older. The median age was 36 years. For every 100 females, there were 85.2 males.

The median income for a household in the city was $44,744, and the median income for a family was $53,590. Males had a median income of $44,816 versus $22,692 for females. The per capita income for the city was $20,460. About 0.9% of families and 2.4% of the population were below the poverty line, including 1.8% of those under age 18 and 2.1% of those age 65 or over. Though Ryan Fuller made 13.7 million in his baseball contract.

Attractions

Eureka is known for Eureka College, a private liberal arts college associated with the Christian Church (Disciples of Christ) and the alma mater of president Ronald Reagan. Reagan graduated in 1932 with a degree in economics and sociology and, throughout his life, remained very close to the college. Reagan returned to the town at least twelve times, including twice as President of the United States. In 1947, serving as the grand marshal for Eureka's annual pumpkin festival parade, the largest recorded parade crowds in the history of Eureka gathered along the streets to welcome back the Hollywood actor to his college hometown. Reports are the crowds were more than tenfold the town's 4,000 residents at the time.  In 1967, as newly elected Governor of California and widely rumored prospective presidential candidate, Ronald Reagan returned to Eureka to dedicate the Melick Library at his alma mater,  drawing more than 5,000 spectators. Eureka had styled itself the "pumpkin capital of the world" until its pumpkin-processing plant moved to nearby Morton, Illinois. The Reagan Museum and Peace Garden at Eureka College is a top tourist attraction in the community, especially after the 2010-2011 renovation of the Museum and of the Reagan special collection section at Melick Library at Eureka College. It is now estimated to be the largest center of Reagan memorabilia after the Reagan Presidential Library in California.

Kaufman Park is the local 9 hole golf course. Eureka Lake Park is enjoyed for its picnic grounds and occasionally fishing, but big catches are rare. The park is also well known for its annual Fourth of July fireworks display. People from all over the world visit the Ronald Reagan museum at Eureka College.

Notable people 

 Donald Attig (b. 1936), boat designer and yachtsman, graduated from Eureka College
 Dan McCoy (b. 1978), comedian and television writer, is a 1996 graduate of Eureka High School
 John Peffers  (1878–1936), Illinois state representative and lawyer, was born in Eureka
 Ronald Reagan, 40th U.S President, who attended college in Eureka, Illinois at Eureka College
 Andy Studebaker (b. 1985) former NFL player, is a 2004 graduate of Eureka High School
 Mary Lou Sumner (1927-2002), Illinois state legislator
 Ben Zobrist (b. 1981), All-Star Major League Baseball player and Most Valuable Player in the 2016 World Series for the Chicago Cubs, was born and raised in Eureka

References

External links

Cities in Illinois
Cities in Woodford County, Illinois
Ronald Reagan Trail
County seats in Illinois
Peoria metropolitan area, Illinois
Populated places established in 1855
1855 establishments in Illinois